Birgithe Lykke Kühle, née Solberg (1762 in Copenhagen - 1832 in Sønderby), was a Norwegian (originally Danish) journalist and managing editor who has been referred to as the first female journalist in Norway.

Birgithe Kühle was the daughter of the Danish captain and merchant Søren Lykke Solberg and Anne Marie Staal. In 1780, she married major Carl Nicolai Christian von Kühle (1748-1812), who was stationed in Bergen, Norway from 1786-1802. She published the paper Provincial-Lecture in Bergen 1794-95. The paper mainly consisted of translated popular science, novels and articles from English, French and German magazines. She was also active as an actor and playwright for the amateur theatre Det Dramatiske Selskab in Bergen, which was founded and led by her spouse in 1794–1801. She returned to Denmark when her spouse had been given a position in Horsens in 1802.

See also
 List of women printers and publishers before 1800

References 

1762 births
1832 deaths
Norwegian journalists
Norwegian editors
18th-century Norwegian women writers
18th-century journalists
History of Bergen
18th-century publishers (people)
18th-century Norwegian actresses 
18th-century dramatists and playwrights
Norwegian magazine founders
18th-century women journalists
Norwegian people of Danish descent